Mackey Ford is an unincorporated community in York County, Pennsylvania, United States.

Notes 
It is possible, though extremely unlikely as many sources say otherwise, that the area is abandoned, but that is not confirmed by a primary source.

References 

Unincorporated communities in York County, Pennsylvania
Unincorporated communities in Pennsylvania